Hypocalymma robustum, the Swan River myrtle, is a species of shrub in the myrtle family Myrtaceae. It is endemic to the south west region of Western Australia.
 
It  usually grows up to between 0.4 and 1 metre in height.   
Pink flowers are produced between June and November (early winter to late spring) in its native range.

The species was initially given the name Leptospermum robustum without description, and later formally described by botanist John Lindley in Edward's Botanical Register in 1843.

Cultivation
Its  attractive flowers and compact size make it a desirable garden plant. However, it does need a climate where the summers are dry.
It requires good drainage and prefers a sunny or partially shaded position and has moderate frost resistance. Propagation is from semi-mature cuttings or seed.

References

robustum
Endemic flora of Western Australia
Rosids of Western Australia
Taxa named by Stephan Endlicher
Plants described in 1843